Neoserixia is a genus of longhorn beetles in the subfamily Lamiinae.

Species

References 

Saperdini